The 2021–22 Madhya Pradesh Premier League was the 2nd season of the Madhya Pradesh Premier League, the first professional league in the Indian state of Madhya Pradesh. It is organised by the Madhya Pradesh Football Association.

The 2nd season kicked off on the 03 October 2021, with 12 teams competing for the title and qualification for the I-League 2nd Division. The 12 teams were divided into two groups. teams played once against each other in a round-robin format. 2 teams from each group qualified for the Super Four round where they played once against each other. Top 2 teams of the Super Four round Sehore Boys and Eagles FC played in the final.

Eagles FC won the final and crowned champions of the league.

Teams

Group stage

Group A

Group B

Super Four
 Final

References

Football in Madhya Pradesh
2021–22 in Indian football leagues